Hemet Unified School District is a school district in Hemet, California which covers; Hemet, East Hemet, Valle Vista, Anza, Winchester, and Idyllwild . Christi Barrett is the district's Superintendent, having succeeded Dr. Barry L. Kayrell, EdD in June 2016. Marilyn Forst is the president of the Board of Education.

Schools

Preschools 
Hemet Preschool

Elementary schools 
Bautista Creek Elementary School
Cawston Elementary School
Cottonwood School(K-8) 
Fruitvale Elementary School*
Hamilton School(K-6)
Harmony Elementary School
Hemet Elementary School
Idyllwild School (K-8)
 Jacob Wiens Elementary School
Little Lake Elementary School*
 McSweeny Elementary School
lRamona Elementary School
Valle Vista Elementary School
Whittier Elementary School
Winchester Elementary School

Middle schools 
Acacia Middle School*
Cottonwood Middle School*
Dartmouth Middle School*
Diamond Valley Middle School
Hamilton Middle School (Secondary Campus)
Idyllwild*
Rancho Viejo Middle School
Western Center Academy*

High schools 
Hemet Senior High School*
West Valley High School
Hamilton High School
Tahquitz High School
Western Center Academy*

References

External links
 

School districts in Riverside County, California
Hemet, California